is the 20th single from Aya Matsuura, a Hello! Project solo artist. It was released on May 1, 2008 under the Zetima label.

Track listings

CD
1. 
2. 
This song was originally featured on her 2006 album "Naked Songs".

Aya Matsuura songs
Zetima Records singles
2008 singles
Song recordings produced by Tsunku
2008 songs
Song articles with missing songwriters